Frankish (reconstructed endonym: *), also known as Old Franconian or Old Frankish, was the West Germanic language spoken by the Franks  from the 5th to 9th century.

After the Salian Franks settled in Roman Gaul, its speakers  in Picardy and Île-de-France were outnumbered by the local populace who spoke Proto-Romance dialects. However, many modern French words and place names, including the eventual country's name of "France", have a Frankish (i.e. Germanic) origin. France itself is still known by terms literal meaning the "Frankish Realm" in languages such as German, Yiddish, Dutch, the derived Afrikaans, and Danish as well as Swedish and Norwegian.

Between the 5th and 9th centuries, Frankish spoken in Northwestern France, present-day Belgium, and the Netherlands is subsequently referred to as Old Dutch, whereas the Frankish varieties spoken in the Rhineland were heavily influenced by Elbe Germanic dialects and the Second Germanic consonant shift and would form part of the modern Central Franconian and Rhine Franconian dialects of German and Luxembourgish.

The Old Frankish language is poorly attested and mostly reconstructed from Frankish loanwords in Old French, and Old Dutch, as recorded in the 6th to 12th centuries. A notable exception is the Bergakker inscription, which may represent a primary record of 5th-century Frankish, though it is debated whether the inscription is written in Frankish, or Old Dutch.

Nomenclature

Germanic philology and German studies have their origins in the first half of the 19th century when Romanticism and Romantic thought heavily influenced the lexicon of the linguists and philologists of the time, including pivotal figures such as the Brothers Grimm. "old tribes", i.e. the six Germanic tribes then thought to have formed the "German nation" in the traditional German nationalism of the elites) resulting in a taxonomy which spoke of "Bavarian", "Saxon", "Frisian", "Thuringian", "Swabian" and "Frankish" dialects. While this nomenclature became generally accepted in traditional Germanic philology, it has also been described as "inherently inaccurate" as these ancient ethnic boundaries (as understood in the 19th century) bore little or limited resemblance to the actual or historical linguistic situation of the Germanic languages. Among other problems, this traditional classification of the continental West Germanic dialects can suggest stronger ties between dialects than is linguistically warranted. The Franconian group is a well known example of this, with East Franconian being much more closely related to Bavarian dialects than it is to Dutch, which is traditionally placed in the Low Franconian sub-grouping and with which it was thought to have had a common, tribal origin.

In a modern linguistic context, the language of the early Franks is variously called "Old Frankish" or "Old Franconian" and refers to the language of the Franks prior to the advent of the High German consonant shift, which took place between 600 and 700 CE. After this consonant shift the Frankish dialect diverges, with the dialects which would become modern Dutch not undergoing the consonantal shift, while all others did so to varying degrees. As a result, the distinction between Old Dutch and Old Frankish is largely negligible, with Old Dutch (also called Old Low Franconian) being the term used to differentiate between the affected and non-affected variants following the aforementioned Second Germanic consonant shift.

History

Origins

The Germanic languages are traditionally divided into three groups: West, East and North Germanic. Their exact relation is difficult to determine, and they remained mutually intelligible throughout the Migration Period, rendering some individual varieties difficult to classify.

The language spoken by the Franks was part of the West Germanic language group, which had features from Proto-Germanic in the late Jastorf culture (ca. 1st century BC). The West Germanic group is characterized by a number of phonological and morphological innovations not found in North and East Germanic. The West Germanic varieties of the time are generally split into three dialect groups: Ingvaeonic (North Sea Germanic), Istvaeonic (Weser-Rhine Germanic) and Irminonic (Elbe Germanic). While each had its own distinct characteristics, there certainly must have still been a high degree of mutual intelligibility between these dialects. In fact, it is unclear whether the West Germanic continuum of this time period, or indeed Franconian itself, should still be considered a single language or if it should be considered a collection of similar dialects.

In any case, it appears that the Frankish tribes, or the later Franks, fit primarily into the Istvaeonic dialect group, with certain Ingvaeonic influences towards the northwest (still seen in modern Dutch), and more Irminonic (High German) influences towards the southeast.

Salian and Ripuarian Franks (210–500)
The scholarly consensus concerning the Migration Period is that the Frankish identity emerged during the first half of the 3rd century out of various earlier, smaller Germanic groups, including the Salii, Sicambri, Chamavi, Bructeri, Chatti, Chattuarii, Ampsivarii, Tencteri, Ubii, Batavi, and Tungri. It is speculated that these tribes originally spoke a range of related Istvaeonic dialects in the West Germanic branch of Proto-Germanic. Sometime in the 4th or 5th centuries, it becomes appropriate to speak of Old Franconian rather than an Istvaeonic dialect of Proto-Germanic.

Very little is known about what the language was like during this period. One older runic sentence (dating from around 425–450 AD) is on the sword sheath of Bergakker which is either the singular direct attestation of the Old Franconian language or the earliest attestation of Old Low Franconian (Old Dutch) language. Another early sentence from the early 6th century AD (that is described as the earliest sentence in Old Dutch as well) is found in the Lex Salica. This phrase was used to free a serf:

"Maltho thi afrio lito"
(I say, I free you, half-free.)

These are the earliest sentences yet found of Old Franconian.

During this early period, the Franks were divided politically and geographically into two groups: the Salian Franks and the Ripuarian Franks. The language (or set of dialects) spoken by the Salian Franks during this period is sometimes referred to as early "Old Low Franconian", and consisted of two groups: "Old West Low Franconian" and "Old East Low Franconian". The language (or set of dialects) spoken by the Ripuarian Franks are referred to just as Old Franconian dialects (or, by some, as Old Frankish dialects).

However, as already stated above, it may be more accurate to think of these dialects not as early Old Franconian but as Istvaeonic dialects in the West Germanic branch of Proto-Germanic.

Frankish Empire (500–900)

At around 500 AD the Franks probably spoke a range of related dialects and languages rather than a single uniform dialect or language. The language of both government and the Church was Latin.

Area

Austrasia

During the expansion into France and Germany, many Frankish people remained in the original core Frankish territories in the north (i.e. southern Netherlands, Flanders, a small part of northern France, and the adjoining area in Germany centered on Cologne). The Franks united as a single group under Salian Frank leadership around 500 AD. Politically, the Ripuarian Franks existed as a separate group only until about 500 AD, after which they were subsumed into the Salian Franks. The Franks were united, but the various Frankish groups must have continued to live in the same areas, and speak the same dialects, although as a part of the growing Frankish Kingdom.

There must have been a close relationship between the various Franconian dialects. There was also a close relationship between Old Low Franconian (i.e. Old Dutch) and its neighboring Old Saxon and Old Frisian languages and dialects to the north and northeast, as well as the related Old English (Anglo-Saxon) dialects spoken in southern and eastern Britain.

A widening cultural divide grew between the Franks remaining in the north and the rulers far to the south. Franks continued to reside in their original territories and to speak their original dialects and languages. It is not known what they called their language, but it is possible that they always called it "Diets" (i.e. "the people's language") or something similar.

Philologists think of Old Dutch and Old West Low Franconian as being the same language. However, sometimes reference is made to a transition from the language spoken by the Salian Franks to Old Dutch. The language spoken by the Salian Franks must have developed significantly during the seven centuries from 200 to 900 AD. At some point, the language spoken by the Franks must have become identifiably Dutch. Because Franconian texts are almost non-existent and Old Dutch texts scarce and fragmentary, it is difficult to determine when such a transition occurred, but it is thought to have happened by the end of the 9th century and perhaps earlier. By 900 AD the language spoken was recognizably an early form of Dutch, but that might also have been the case earlier. Old Dutch made the transition to Middle Dutch around 1150. A Dutch-French language boundary came into existence (but this was originally south of where it is today). Even though living in the original territory of the Franks, these Franks seem to have broken with the endonym "Frank" around the 9th century. By this time the Frankish identity had changed from an ethnic identity to a national identity, becoming localized and confined to the modern Franconia in Germany and principally to the French province of Île-de-France.

Gaul
The Franks expanded south into Gaul. Although the Franks would eventually conquer almost all of Gaul, speakers of Old Franconian expanded only into northern Gaul in numbers sufficient to have a linguistic effect. For several centuries, northern Gaul was a bilingual territory (Vulgar Latin and Franconian). The language used in writing, in government and by the Church was Latin. Eventually, the Franks who had settled more to the south of this area in northern Gaul started adopting the Vulgar Latin of the local population. This Vulgar Latin language acquired the name of the people who came to speak it (Frankish or Français); north of the French-Dutch language boundary, the language was no longer referred to as "Frankish" (if it ever was referred to as such) but rather came to be referred to as "Diets", i.e. the "people's language". Urban T. Holmes has proposed that a Germanic language continued to be spoken as a second tongue by public officials in western Austrasia and Neustria as late as the 850s, and that it completely disappeared as a spoken language from these regions only during the 10th century.

German Franconia

The Franks also expanded their rule southeast into parts of Germany. Their language had some influence on local dialects, especially for terms relating to warfare. 
However, since the language of both the administration and the Church was Latin, this unification did not lead to the development of a supra-regional variety of Franconian nor a standardized German language. At the same time that the Franks were expanding southeast into what is now southern Germany, there were linguistic changes taking place in the region. The High German consonant shift (or second Germanic consonant shift) was a phonological development (sound change) that took place in the southern parts of the West Germanic dialect continuum in several phases, probably beginning between the 3rd and 5th centuries AD, and was almost complete before the earliest written records in the High German language were made in the 9th century. The resulting language, Old High German, can be neatly contrasted with Low Franconian, which for the most part did not experience the shift.

Franconian languages

The set of dialects of the Franks who continued to live in their original territory in Germany eventually developed in three different ways and eventually formed three modern branches of Franconian languages.
 The dialects spoken by the Salian Franks in the Low Countries (Old Dutch, also referred to as Old West Low Franconian) developed into the Dutch language, which itself has a number of distinct dialects. Afrikaans developed from early Modern Dutch's Hollandic dialect spoken in the Cape Colony.
 The Old East Low Franconian dialects are represented today in Limburgish. Old Limburgish continued to develop under heavy Low Rhenish and Dutch influence which gradually made it more mutually intelligible with neighboring varieties. Since the incorporation of Limburg into the Dutch state in the late 16th century, Limburgish has experienced heavy influence from Dutch, to the point where the two are today mutually intelligible to a significant degree. Limburgish itself has a number of dialects.
 It is speculated that the dialects originally spoken by the Ripuarian Franks in Germany possibly developed into, or were subsumed under, the German dialects called the Central Franconian dialects (Ripuarian Franconian, Moselle Franconian and Rhenish Franconian). These languages and dialects were later affected by serious language changes (such as the High German consonant shift), which resulted in the emergence of dialects that are now considered German dialects. Today, the Central Franconian dialects are spoken in the core territory of the Ripuarian Franks. Although there may not be definite proof to say that the dialects of the Ripuarian Franks (about which very little is known) developed into the Central Franconian dialects, there are—apart from mere probability—some pieces of evidence, most importantly the development -hs → ss and the loss of n before spirants, which is found throughout Central Franconian but nowhere else in High German. Compare Luxembourgish Uess ("ox"), Dutch os, German Ochse; and (dated) Luxembourgish Gaus ("goose"), Old Dutch gās, German Gans. The language spoken by Charlemagne was probably the dialect that later developed into the Ripuarian Franconian dialect.

The Frankish Empire later extended throughout neighboring France and Germany. The language of the Franks had some influence on the local languages (especially in France), but did not develop into the standard language or lingua franca.

The Franks conquered adjoining territories of Germany (including the territory of the Allemanni). The Frankish legacy survives in these areas, for example, in the names of the city of Frankfurt and the area of Franconia. 
The Franks brought their language with them from their original territory and, as in France, it must have had an effect on the local dialects and languages. However, it is relatively difficult for linguists today to determine what features of these dialects are due to Frankish influence, because the latter was in large part obscured, or even overwhelmed, by later developments.

Influence on Old French and Middle English
Most French words of Germanic origin came from Frankish, often replacing the Latin word which would have been used. It is estimated that modern French took approximately 1000 stem words from Old Franconian. Many of these words were concerned with agriculture (e.g.  "garden"), war (e.g.  "war") or social organization (e.g.  "baron"). Old Franconian has introduced the modern French word for the nation, France (Francia), meaning "land of the Franks". According to one hypothesis, the name for the Paris region, Île-de-France was also given by the Franks. 

The influence of Franconian on French is decisive for the birth of the early Langue d'oïl compared to the other Romance languages, that appeared later such as Langue d'oc, Romanian, Portuguese, Spanish, Italian, etc., because its influence was greater than the respective influence of Visigothic and Lombardic (both Germanic languages) on the langue d'oc, the Romance languages of Iberia, and Italian. Not all of these loanwords have been retained in modern French. French has also passed on words of Franconian origin to other Romance languages, and to English.

Old Franconian has also left many etyma in the different Northern Langues d'oïls such as Picard, Champenois, Bas-Lorrain and Walloon, more than in Common French, and not always the same ones.

See below a non-exhaustive list of French words of Frankish origin. An asterisk prefixing a term indicates a reconstructed form of the Frankish word. Most Franconian words with the phoneme w changed it to gu when entering Old French and other Romance languages; however, the northern langue d'oïl dialects such as Picard, Northern Norman, Walloon, Burgundian, Champenois and Bas-Lorrain retained the [w] or turned it into [v]. Perhaps the best known example is the Franconian *werra ("war" < Old Northern French werre, compare Old High German werre "quarrel"), which entered modern French as guerre and guerra in Italian, Occitan, Catalan, Spanish and Portuguese. Other examples include "gant" ("gauntlet", from *want) and "garder" ("to guard", from *wardōn). Franconian words starting with s before another consonant developed it into es- (e.g. Franconian skirm and Old French escremie > Old Italian scrimia > Modern French escrime).

Old French
Franconian speech habits are also responsible for the replacement of Latin cum ("with") with od ← apud "at", then with avuec ← apud hoc "at it" ≠ Italian, Spanish con) in Old French (Modern French avec), and for the preservation of Latin nominative homo "man" as an impersonal pronoun: cf. homme ← hominem "man (accusative)" and Old French hum, hom, om → modern on, "one" (compare Dutch man "man" and men, "one").

Middle English
Middle English also adopted many words with Franconian roots from Old French; e.g. random (via Old French randon, Old French verb randir, from *rant "a running"), standard (via Old French estandart, from *standhard "stand firm"), scabbard (via Anglo-French *escauberc, from *skar-berg), grape, stale, march (via Old French marche, from *marka) among others.

See also

 Franconian languages
 History of French
 List of French words of Germanic origin
 List of Portuguese words of Franconian origin
 List of Spanish words of Franconian origin
 Low Franconian languages
 Old High German
 List of English Latinates of Germanic origin

Endnotes

External links

  (a linguistic analysis of the Bergakker scabbard)

Dutch language
Extinct Germanic languages
Frankish people
Languages attested from the 5th century
Languages extinct in the 9th century
Franconian, Old
West Germanic languages
Languages with own distinct writing systems